Microbial cell factory is an approach to bioengineering which considers microbial cells as a production facility in which the optimization process largely depends on metabolic engineering. MCFs is a derivation of cell factories, which are engineered microbes and plant cells. In 1980s and 1990s, MCFs were originally conceived to improve productivity of cellular systems and metabolite yields through strain engineering. A MCF develops native and nonnative metabolites through targeted strain design. In addition, MCFs can shorten the synthesis cycle while reducing the difficulty of product separation.

History 
Prior to MCFs, scientists employed traditional engineering techniques to produce various commodities. These methodologies include modifying metabolic pathways, eliminating enzymes, or the balancing of ATP to drive metabolic flux. However, when these approaches were applied for industrial productions, they could not withstand the industrial environments that consisted of toxins and fluctuating temperatures. Ultimately, the techniques were never able to scale up and output bio-products that were obtained in the laboratory.

Thus, MCFs were developed by using a heterogenous biosynthesis pathway in a microbial host. As a host, MCFs take in various substrates and convert them into valuable compounds. These products can range from fuels, chemical, food ingredients, to pharmaceuticals.

Structure

Cell Wall 
In microbial cells, the cell walls are either Gram-positive or Gram-negative. These outcomes are based on the Gram Stain test. Gram-positive cell walls have thick peptidoglycan layer and no outer lipid membrane while Gram-negative bacteria have a thin peptidoglycan layer and an outer lipid membrane. Although a thick Gram-positive cell wall is advantageous, it is easier to attack as the peptidoglycan layer absorbs antibiotics and cleaning products. A Gram-negative cell wall is more resistant to such attacks and more difficult to destroy.

Membrane 
The membrane of microbial cells are bilayers, composed of phospholipids. The phospholipids may range in chain length to branching. Ultimately, the phospholipid will determine the membrane properties, such as fluidity and charge, that will regulate the interactions with nearby proteins. In addition, the membrane oversees the development of the cell's morphology and cell sizes. Escherichia coli is often utilized a base line to differentiate and define the membrane of MCFs.

Nucleoid 
The nucleoid forms an irregular shaped region within a prokaryote cell, containing all or majority of the genetic material to reproduce. The nucleoid controls the activity of the MCF and reproduction of itself and products.

Current Developments 
Current methods of programming MCFs utilize strain engineering, which rely on random mutagenesis. In addition, the conventional techniques are labor-intensive, timely, and difficult to analyze. This has led many scientific trials to utilize genomic editing tools to improve MCFs, such as ZFNs, TALENs, and CRISPR. These approaches allow genetic manipulation and analysis, specifically creating double stranded breaks within a genome sequence.

ZFNs 
Zinc-finger nucleases (ZFNs) were the first genomic editing tool to be able to target any genomic site. By inducing a double-stranded break, ZFNs can facilitate targeted editing. However, when employed to reinforce MCFs, ZFNs have an unusual low success rate. In various trials, the ZFNs were unable to obtain a three-finger array or the triplet was unable to be assembled into a new sequence. Thus, incorporation of ZFNs into MCFs has remained strenuous and costly.

TALENs 
Transcription activator-like effector nucleases (TALENs) work in a similar manner to ZFNs, but TALENs are based on fusion proteins. TALENs have been applied to numerous MCFs, such as yeast and zebrafish. Many developments has explored fairyTALE, a liquid phase synthesis TALEN platform, to create nucleases, activators, and repressors for MCFs. Although TALENs have fewer obstacles than ZFNs, they are still troublesome as assembling large quantities of repeats into an array remains a significant problem.

CRISPR 
Clustered regularly interspaced palindromic repeats (CRISPR) and its associated proteins (Cas) has become one of the most popular genome editing tools due to its efficiency and low cost. The CRISPR/CAS9 has been utilized to enhance MCFs to produce yeast, bacteria, and E.coli. When optimizing yeast, CRISPR/CAS9 promoting S.pyogenes has been found to be the most influential strategy. For E.coli, studies have determined a strategy preventing genome instability to be the most robust metabolic engineering approach regardless of the specific methodology.

Large-Scale Application 
The most significant advantage of MCFs is the ability to be utilized in industrial environments with minimal limitations. Through metabolic engineering, MCFs rely on innovative strategic tools for the development and optimization of metabolic and gene regulatory networks for efficient production. Going from lab to large scale development involves consideration of three factors: product yield, productivity, and the product titre. A common dilemma however is the trade-off between product yield and productivity. If a company maximizes productivity, they will ultimately lower their product yield and vice versa.

To combat this issue, strategies have been developed to maximize all three factors. One of the most common techniques is utilizing fed-batch culture. Fed-batch culture is, in the broadest sense, defined as an operational technique in biotechnological processes where one or more nutrients (substrates) are fed (supplied) to the bioreactor during cultivation and in which the product(s) remain in the bioreactor until the end of the run. Another method is utilizing continuous cultivation strategy. The premise behind continuous cultivation is to maintain a steady-state cell metabolism over long periods of times. By having multiple approaches for MCF, companies may customize each process to their specific product(s).

Commercialization 
The commercialization of MCFs has ranged from chemical to biofuels.

References 

Biological engineering